Levi Schmitt, M.D. is a fictional character from the medical drama television series Grey's Anatomy, which airs on the American Broadcasting Company (ABC) in the United States. The character is portrayed by Jake Borelli.

Levi is introduced as a sub-intern at Grey Sloan Memorial Hospital at the beginning of the fourteenth season, eventually obtaining the position of a resident in the sixteenth season. The character was originally a recurring guest star, whose main focus was comic relief due to his clumsiness and lack of social skills. However, as the series progressed into the fifteenth season, focus on Schmitt grew around him questioning  his sexuality, his desire to become more confident and his difficult relationship with his overbearing mother. Borelli was upgraded to the main cast starting in the sixteenth season while occasionally making appearances on the series' companion show Station 19.

Schmitt is notable for being the series' first gay male series regular and the first LGBTQ main character since the departures of Callie Torres and Arizona Robbins in seasons twelve and fourteen, respectively. He's also the series' second Jewish main character after Dr. Cristina Yang. His relationship with openly gay orthopedic surgeon, Dr. Nico Kim has also been praised by critics and fans alike.

Background 
Levi has lived in Seattle for an undisclosed amount of time with his mother, specifically in her basement. Growing up, Levi was in the debate club and spent most of his time playing Dungeons and Dragons rather than socializing with his peers. He also struggled to adapt socially due to his mother's over protective tendencies and neuroticism. Due to his mother's constant worrying, Levi developed an issue with his self-confidence and clumsiness which interfered with his everyday life by preventing him from working to the best of his abilities.

Eventually, Levi decided to attend medical school and managed to finish in the top 10% of his medical school program. It was at this point he decided to remain living in his mother's basement due to the high cost of medical school. Levi comes from a close Jewish family. They decided to help him get through medical school by contributing money and thus remain heavily invested in his career choices.

Levi first arrived at Grey-Sloan Memorial Hospital as part of a clerkship group doing a rotation as a way for Richard Webber and April Kepner to evaluate their performance before giving them an official interview for an internship. After an interview with Webber and Miranda Bailey, Grey Sloan decided to offer him an internship. His family eventually gave him the green light to complete his internship there due to its reputation of producing highly skilled surgeons. He befriended other interns such as  Taryn Helm, Casey Parker and Dahlia Qadri.

Storylines 
Upon arriving for his clerkship at Grey-Sloan, Levi and the rest of the fourth-year med students were greeted by Webber, who gave them a tour of the hospital. Levi got the opportunity to observe Jo Wilson's surgery only to have his glasses slip from his face and fall inside the patient when he leaned over the body cavity. After this incident Levi earned the nickname "Glasses" due to his clumsiness. Levi and the other sub-interns were then tasked with finding a suitable donor to repair Megan Hunt's abdomen, a procedure led by Meredith Grey. Levi was the only one who managed to find a donor and went to Jo for help on how to approach the family. However, Jo took credit for the finding and got to scrub in. Eventually, Schmitt was able to get an interview for an internship at Grey Sloan and was accepted into the program by Dr. Webber and Dr. Bailey. By this time he had acquired an elastic band to keep his glasses intact with his face; he rejected the idea of getting contacts due to his ommetaphobia. One of his most notable surgeries included assisting Dr. Grey on a splenectomy. Grey was unable to retrieve the rare blood type of O negative from the hospital's blood bank due to a hacker holding Grey Sloan's computer software hostage until a ransom was paid. Schmitt volunteered to do a blood transfusion due to having the same blood type and was credited with saving the patient's life. This incident earned him the new nickname "Blood Bank."

Schmitt later gets the opportunity to assist on a surgery involving a severe open femur fracture. Jackson Avery and Owen Hunt led the case and were joined by a talented orthopedic surgeon, Atticus Lincoln, and his orthopedic fellow, Nico Kim, who were new doctors at Grey-Sloan. During surgery, Levi was left flustered when Nico winked at him. Later that night, Nico bought him a beer at Joe's Bar and subtly flirted with him, leaving Schmitt more confused and questioning his sexuality. The following weeks, Nico took an interest in Levi but wasn't sure if the feeling was mutual due to Schmitt not reciprocating his advances. However, Schmitt was indeed interested just nervous due to the fact that he had never dated anyone before, much less a man. After assisting Dr. Lincoln and Nico on a surgery, Levi found himself alone in the elevator with Nico and the two shared their first kiss. However, Nico was taken back by Levi's revelation that he had never kissed a man before. Not wanting to relive the "shame spiral" and his coming out experience again, Nico abruptly ended things with him, much to Levi's disappointment. A week later, a severe windstorm hit Seattle, which left Nico and Levi to work together to evacuate the hospital's clinic. Levi, who was still hurt by Nico's actions, was bitter and confrontational. Levi put his emotions aside after witnessing Nico get blown away by a gust of wind, mildly injuring him. The two sought refuge in an abandoned ambulance as Levi tended to Nico's wounds. While waiting out the storm, Levi took the opportunity to stand up to Nico and refute any possibility of a shame spiral. Levi admitted  that he never knew he was gay when he was younger because he never got the opportunity to explore his feelings due to always secluding himself and not having enough confidence to do anything about it until he met Nico. Touched by his speech, Nico kissed Levi again and the two then had sex for the first time.

As his relationship with Nico flourished, Levi began to feel more confident in his abilities as a doctor. Levi was then tasked to intubate Dr. Hunt after he was accidentally injected with a sedative during surgery. Andrew DeLuca guided Schmitt during his first intubation and successfully placed the tube. He was then put in charge of monitoring Dr. Hunt as he waited for the sedative to wear off. After successfully extubating Owen, Levi introduced himself as Dr. Schmitt to Teddy Altman rather than one of his nicknames. Wanting to look as confident as he felt, Levi decided to start wearing contacts. For the next couple months, Levi and Nico slept together continuously throughout the hospital. Riding on this momentum, Levi proudly came out as gay to Meredith, Andrew and Jo during surgery, who responded by congratulating him. He also earned the respect of other doctors such as Arizona Robbins and Dr. Bailey. However, Nico became upset after Levi refused to let his mother know about him due to his mother's neuroticism. Not yet ready to tell his mother that he was dating a man, Nico came to accept it. Levi then confessed his love for Nico. Afterwards, Nico told Levi that he had an interview with a hospital in San Francisco, which worried Levi about the future of their relationship. That same day, Nico made a fatal error during surgery which ultimately led to the first death of one of his patients and took out his frustrations on Levi. Going out of his way to buy Nico flowers at a local flower shop, Levi met Lucas Ripley, the fire chief of the Seattle Fire Department. The two bonded while deciding which flowers to buy for their significant others. While leaving the flower shop, Levi came across Ripley laying on the sidewalk unconscious and immediately got him to Grey Sloan. Schmitt was hailed a hero for saving the fire chief, however, Ripley's condition was found to be worse than previously thought and ultimately died. Nico eventually realized he mistreated Levi and later apologized. The two reconciled after Nico finally opened up about his feelings and personal struggles. That same night, Levi invited Nico over and came out to his mother by introducing him as his boyfriend.

After officially beginning his residency at Grey-Sloan, Levi struggled with self-doubt by constantly putting himself down. With the help of Nico, Levi worked to overcome these obstacles, including his difficult relationship with his mother, Myrna. Things became worse for Levi when Meredith was fired from Grey-Sloan for insurance fraud and he was subpoenaed in order to give a witness testimony at her court hearing. He told the prosecutor that he reported what he thought was an error in a patient's hospital bracelet who had the name Ellis Grey, Meredith's deceased mother. Upon realizing that Levi was indirectly responsible for Meredith getting fired, the other residents began to shun and ridicule him. Eventually, Levi finally finds the courage to stand up to his mother after visiting his dying uncle Saul, who also turned out to be gay. Levi moves out of his mother's basement immediately, feeling she isn't accepting of who he is. Levi and Nico ultimately hit a rough patch in their relationship when Levi begins to feel a lack of an emotional connection after Nico doesn't ask him to move in with him. However, Nico seems content with the physical aspect of their relationship and wants things to proceed at a slower pace much to Levi's frustration. Wanting to meet his family, Levi is stunned after Nico reveals he still hasn't come out to them. Feeling lied to, Levi begins to doubt his relationship with Nico, who he feels isn't treating him as an equal or sacrificing anything for him. After Link recommends Nico to the Seattle Mariners for his old job as team doctor, Levi worries that the two will grow further apart. Levi vents his concerns to Nico who in return breaks up with him feeling he can't give Levi the emotional connection he seeks. Reeling over his breakup, Levi is comforted by Jo who asks him to be her roommate after her divorce from Alex. Eventually, Levi and Nico reconcile again during the COVID-19 pandemic. He also becomes roommates with Taryn Helm during the pandemic.

Development

Casting and creation
While casting was underway for the role, Borelli was living in New York and reveals he sent in an audition tape but didn't expect a call back due to the shows popularity. However, two weeks after sending the tape he received a call to fly out to Los Angeles to film his scenes. Initially, the role of Levi was set to appear in one or two episodes as a guest co-star at the beginning of the fourteenth season, however Borelli was then invited back again to film eight more episodes after completing his first two.

Borelli was later officially cast as the role of Levi in a recurring capacity as part of the show's new batch of interns at Grey Sloan Memorial Hospital, along with Jeanine Mason as Sam Bello, Sophia Ali as Dahlia Qadri, Rushi Kota as Vikram Roy, Alex Blue Davis as Casey Parker and Jaicy Elliot as Taryn Helm. He made his first appearance in the fourteenth-season episode "Break Down the House" as a fourth year medical student and later returned as an intern in the fourth episode "Ain't That a Kick in the Head." After thorough character development in the fifteenth season, Borelli was upgraded from recurring to series regular starting with the show's sixteenth season.

When asked about Borelli's first major storyline in the fifteenth season, series showrunner Krista Vernoff stated:

Characterization
Borelli characterized Levi as "this bumbling, klutzy, really earnest guy who [is] just trying to learn and prove himself in this new job." Vernoff describes Levi as "sort of a clumsy, fumfering type who would trip over his own feet and stutter" while Borelli said "he doesn’t have the best track record in terms of having things work perfectly for him" to explain his constant mishaps and misfortunes over the course of the show. Paulette Cohn of Parade Magazine called Levi a "comic relief" character after he dropped his glasses inside a patient during a surgery, earning him the nickname "Glasses".

Levi is also known for being the show's first Jewish main character since the departure of Cristina Yang at the end of the tenth season. However, unlike Cristina, who was an atheist, Levi is still in touch with some qualities of his faith. For instance, in the episode "Jump into the Fog", Levi sings the Jewish prayer "Shalom Rav" in order to calm a woman who suffers from severe agoraphobia, mentioning that his mother sang it to him as a lullaby. The melody used on the show is a well-known cover in the Jewish community by cantor and contemporary musician Jeff Klepper. Levi's background is further explored in the episode "The Last Supper" when he visits his ailing uncle on the brink of death; he then refuses to leave his uncle after his death due to the cultural tradition of Shemira. Later in the episode, Levi's uncle's lover helps him prepare his uncle's body for the Chevra Kaddisha; Levi then recites Psalm 23 before leaving.

By the fifteenth season, Levi's role had expanded and became more prominent with the shows main storylines. Borelli states that Vernoff approached him for a "big storyline" involving his character and she later revealed Levi would be part of the show's first gay male romance that would focus on him coming to terms with sexuality and eventually coming out.

Levi officially came out in the fifteenth mid-season finale episode "Blowin' in the Wind" which in turn inspired Borelli himself to come out as gay alongside his character. Borelli posted on his personal Instagram after the episode aired "As a gay guy myself, tonight's episode was so special to me. This is exactly the kind of story I craved as a young gay kid growing up." In regards to his decision to come out at the same time as Levi, Borelli stated he did it so "others don't feel as alone."

On a broader spectrum, Borelli credited the longtime medical drama for being on the forefront of telling LGBTQ stories of substance over its run:
"Grey’s Anatomy has always been a huge ally in the LGBT community. They have done so much work to push the dial forward for all of us. They have had countless gay characters on the show, which has been amazing as a viewer. Callie Torres and Arizona Robbins’ relationship was so nuanced and so big and so fantastic for the community as a whole, but now that we’re jumping into a different facet, it’s exciting to see, on a personal level, a story that resonates so much with me."

After coming out to his colleagues and entering a relationship with orthopedic fellow Nico Kim, Levi grew more confident and optimistic in his abilities to become a surgeon. As depicted in the episode "Help, I'm Alive", Levi drops the Glasses nickname and introduces himself as Dr. Schmitt to the doctors and hospital staff. Borelli weighed in on Levi's transformation by commenting "I think we’ve seen him sort of take one step into his confidence, into his own body, into his own truth."

Reception 
The character of Levi has received positive reviews from critics and fans alike. Jasmine Blu of TV Fanatic commented on his character saying "he's always been one of my favorite of the newbies. He's so endearing and has such a heartfelt story, and I think he touches people a great deal" and also referred to him as a "fan-favorite". Blu also went on to say that Schmitt was "so lovable and relatable because he's just, his awkwardness and all of that, I think it is still very real and relatable." Taylor Henderson of Pride Magazine said Levi has been "openly embraced" by Grey's Anatomy viewers and has "quickly built a fanbase of his own" in response to Levi's monologue in the episode "Blowin' in the Wind", character growth and romance with Nico Kim.

Levi's coming out storyline in "Blowin' in the Wind" received praise from critics. Jasmine Blu of TV Fanatic applauded Levi for embracing his sexuality saying he "has come into his own though. Words cannot describe how refreshing it is to see him stand up for himself." Ariana Romero of Refinery29 called Levi's coming out moment "a landmark queer love scene" and also noted he was a "rising fan-favorite." Marko Pekic of Spoiler TV called Borelli's performance a "phenomenal interpretation of Schmitt [that] was heartbreaking and empowering at the same time."

Criticism has been directed towards the slow background development in Levi's storyline. However, for the episode "The Last Supper", Meaghan Frey of TV Fanatic praised the insight into Levi's Jewish roots calling his story "touching and exactly what he needed. It made me so much more invested in his character." Frey also lauded a scene where Levi stood up to his mother who struggles to fully accept him. Jasmine Blu also praised the writers for delving deeper into Levi's Jewish background, stating "I loved that the show explored his faith in addition to showing how far he has come in embracing who he is." Paul Dailly of TV Fanatic also reacted positively, saying "it was intriguing, and giving backstory to one of the better characters on the show was needed. Grey's Anatomy excels in character development, and I could watch more episodes about Levi's past."

References

External links

Grey's Anatomy characters
Fictional American Jews
Fictional characters from Seattle
Television characters introduced in 2017
Fictional surgeons
American male characters in television
Fictional LGBT characters in television
Fictional gay males